Robert Vincent may refer to:
Robert Vincent (politician) (born 1956), Quebec politician
Robert Vincent (musician) (born 1976), English blues and country music singer-songwriter
Rob Vincent (born 1990), English footballer
Robert Vincent (priest) (died 1765), Canadian clergy

See also
Robert Vincent Daniels (1926–2010), American historian and educator
George Robert Vincent (1898–1985), sound recording and archiving pioneer